Major General Mamadu Ture Kuruma (or N'Krumah; born 26 April 1947)  is a Bissau-Guinean military vice-chief of staff and the leader of the Military Command that took power following a coup against acting president Raimundo Pereira and former prime minister and leading candidate for president Carlos Gomes Júnior. On 13 April, he promised to form a national unity government within days. On 18 May 2012, the United Nations Security Council adopted a resolution on the travel ban for members of the Military Command, including Kuruma.

References

Bissau-Guinean military personnel
Leaders who took power by coup
Living people
Presidents of Guinea-Bissau
1947 births
Bissau-Guinean Muslims